Journey to the End of the Night is the debut studio album by the Norwegian progressive metal band Green Carnation, released by The End Records on 28 May 2000.

Background 
Journey to the End of the Night is the last composition by Green Carnation featuring founding member Christian "X" Botteri on lead guitar and effects.

"My Dark Reflections of Life and Death", the third track from the album, was re-recorded for the band's 2020 album, Leaves of Yesteryear.

The title is a reference to Louis-Ferdinand Celine's novel Journey to the End of the Night.

Track listing

Personnel
Green Carnation
 Christian "X" Botteri − guitar effects
 Terje Vik Schei − all rhythm guitars
 Alf T Leangel − drums
 Christopher Botteri − bass

Guest musicians
 Rx Draumtanzer − vocals (on tracks 3, 4, 5 and 7)
 Linn Solaas − vocals (on tracks 4 and 5)
 Synne Soprana (In The Woods...) − vocals (on tracks 1 and 8)
 Vibeke Stene (ex-Tristania) − vocals (on tracks 2, 3 and 4)
 Atle Dorum − vocals (on track 2)
 Leif Christian Wiese − violin (on tracks 4, 5 and 7)

References

2000 debut albums
Green Carnation albums